Serhiy Anatoliyovych Shubin (born 22 February 1967 in Kyiv) is a former Ukrainian football player.

References

1967 births
Sportspeople from Kyiv
Living people
Soviet footballers
FC CSKA Kyiv players
FC Torpedo Zaporizhzhia players
FC Nyva Vinnytsia players
Ukrainian footballers
Ukrainian Premier League players
Diósgyőri VTK players
Ukrainian expatriate footballers
Expatriate footballers in Hungary
FC Volyn Lutsk players
FC Krystal Chortkiv players
FC Zhemchuzhina Sochi players
Expatriate footballers in Russia
Russian Premier League players
FC Kuban Krasnodar players
FC Metallurg Lipetsk players
Association football forwards
FC Dynamo Moscow reserves players